Guy Antonio Abrahams (born 7 March 1953) is a Panamanian athlete who competed mainly in the 100 metres. He represented his native country at the 1976 Summer Olympics finishing 5th in the 100 metres. Abrahams studied and competed for the University of Southern California. He won bronze medals in the 100 metres and 200 metres at the 1978 Central American and Caribbean Games.

References

External links

1953 births
Living people
Panamanian male sprinters
Athletes (track and field) at the 1976 Summer Olympics
Olympic athletes of Panama
Competitors at the 1978 Central American and Caribbean Games
Central American and Caribbean Games bronze medalists for Panama
Athletes (track and field) at the 1979 Pan American Games
Pan American Games competitors for Panama
USC Trojans men's track and field athletes
Central American and Caribbean Games medalists in athletics